John Indi is an actor known for his roles in  A Far Off Place (1993), Mandela,  and Incident at Victoria Falls (1992). Indi and his actor wife Kubi Indi, started a company making beauty products company based in Africa.

Background
After Zimbabwe became independent, Indi and his wife Chaza returned to the country. There they started a beauty products company called Kubi Cosmetics which is now a well-known brand in Southern Africa. It makes products that specifically for African skin and  hair.

Career
He played the part of the witch doctor in the 1982 film Shamwari which starred Ian Yule and Ken Gampu. He had a major role, playing the part of Oliver Tambo in the TV movie Mandela which was released in 1987. Another prominent role he had was paying the part of Khumalo in the Bill Corcoran directed film Incident at Victoria Falls which was released in 1992. He appeared as Bamuthi in the 1993 adventure film,  A Far Off Place which was directed by Mikael Salomon. he had a part in Ruggero Deodato's Sotto il cielo dell'Africa aka Thinking About Africa which was released in 1999.

Filmography (selective)

He is also well known as a voiceover artist and has made a few ads for Chicken Licken as well as Kiwi Shoe polish.

.

External links 
 John Indi at IMDb
 John Indi at Fandango
 John Indi Facebook Page

References

20th-century Zimbabwean male actors
Living people
Year of birth missing (living people)
Place of birth missing (living people)
Zimbabwean male television actors
Nationality missing
Zimbabwean male film actors
Zimbabwean male stage actors